Kulindrene was a regions of India related by Ptolemy. According to him, it comprised the upper valleys of the Sutlej, Jumna, Beas, and Ganges. This report may be inaccurate, and the contents of the region somewhat smaller. 

"Kulindrene" is probably the Greek transliteration for the Indian region of the Kuninda, also pronounced Kulinda, which appear in historical records from the 1st century BCE.

Regions of India